Images is an album by pianist Kenny Barron recorded in New York in late 2007 and released on the Sunnyside label.

Reception 

In the review on Allmusic, Ken Dryden noted "These 2007 sessions by Kenny Barron are a bit unusual, as he works with several different groups, playing mostly originals". On All About Jazz Mark F. Turner wrote "The Traveler finds Barron once again on the move—a colorful palette of ten tracks with excellent sounds—featuring a new rhythm section and some very special guests. From the start of the title track, Barron's still got the touch—panache, grace, fire, and empathy. The result is a perfect portrait of his repertoire and depth ... fine recording by one of jazz's most respected pianists". In JazzTimes Mike Joyce observed "A rather unlikely group of musicians tag along with Kenny Barron on The Traveler, making the pianist’s latest studio excursion all the more colorful and, at times, intriguing".

Track listing 
All compositions by Kenny Barron except where noted.

 "The Traveler" – 7:07
 "Clouds" (Kenny Barron, Janice Jarrett) – 7:03
 "Speed Trap" – 7:38
 "Um Beijo" (Barron, Jarrett) – 6:12
 "The First Year" (Alex Nguyen) – 6:15
 "Illusion" – 6:31
 "Duet" (Barron, Lionel Loueke) – 6:19
 "Phantoms" (Barron, Jarrett) – 9:14
 "Calypso" – 6:40
 "Memories of You" (Eubie Blake, Andy Razaf ) – 5:47

Personnel 
Kenny Barron – piano
Steve Wilson – soprano saxophone (tracks 1, 3 & 6)
Lionel Loueke – guitar (tracks 7–9)
Kiyoshi Kitagawa – bass (tracks 1–6, 8 & 9)
Francisco Mela – drums (tracks 1–6, 8 & 9)
Ann Hampton Callaway (track 2), Grady Tate (track 4), Gretchen Parlato (track 8) – vocals

References 

Kenny Barron albums
2008 albums
Sunnyside Records albums